Senator Roethe may refer to:

Edward J. Roethe (1878–1952), Wisconsin State Senate
Henry Edgar Roethe (1866–1939), Wisconsin State Senate